Kushtia International Stadium is located by the Kushtia -  Kushtia,
Khulna,
Bangladesh is a multipurpose stadium which renovated by National Sports Council of Bangladesh government in 2021.

See also 
 Stadiums in Bangladesh
 List of cricket grounds in Bangladesh

Players List 
Kushtia Cricket Team: 
 Kushtia Cricket Team
 Kushtia Cricket Team (U21)
 Kushtia Cricket Team (U19)
 Kushtia Cricket Team (U16)

Notes

References 

Cricket grounds in Bangladesh
Football venues in Bangladesh